The 1982 PGA Tour season was played from January 7 to October 31, and consisted of 44 official money events. Calvin Peete, Craig Stadler, and Tom Watson won the most tournaments, four, and there were five first-time winners. The tournament results, leaders, and award winners are listed below.

The season began as the "TPA Tour," then reverted to the "PGA Tour" in mid-March. The "Tournament Players Association" name had been adopted less than seven months earlier, in late August 1981.

Schedule
The following table lists official events during the 1982 season.

Unofficial events
The following events were sanctioned by the PGA Tour, but did not carry official money, nor were wins official.

Money leaders
The money list was based on prize money won during the season, calculated in U.S. dollars.

Awards

Notes

References

External links
PGA Tour official site

PGA Tour seasons
PGA Tour